Keiss Castle is a partially ruined castle in Scotland, which stands on sheer cliffs overlooking  Sinclair's Bay less than one mile north of Keiss village centre, Caithness, Highland, Scotland. It is protected as a scheduled monument. The old castle was replaced by Keiss House around 1755.

The castle was constructed as a Z-plan tower house with 4 floors plus an attic and a vaulted basement. It had a pair of corner towers at opposite angles of a square central block, the main tower being very narrow for its height with tall chimneystacks.

History
The castle was built possibly on the site of an earlier fort in the late 16th or early 17th century by George Sinclair, 5th Earl of Caithness (1582-1643). It seems the castle was in existence in 1623 when James I commissioned Sir Robert Gordon to enter Caithness with an armed force. The 7th Earl died in the castle in 1698 but it is reported that the castle was ruinous in 1700 and in 1726 as being in repair with 'at the side of it a convenient house lately built'. The estate was purchased by Sir William Sinclair, 2nd Baronet of Dunbeath early in the 18th century and in 1752 Keiss became his family seat.

The current house was built about 1755 but had to be sold in 1765 because of financial difficulties to the Sinclairs of nearby Ulbster. This Category B listed baronial mansion was altered to its current form on the instructions of Col. K. Macleay by David Bryce in 1860, during which it was extended in the Scottish baronial style. It was then sold to the Duke of Portland in 1866. Also included in the listing is the Walled garden to the NE of the house and the gate lodge and gate piers with cast-iron carriage gates installed in the 1860 alterations.

References

External links
Keiss Castle, Caithness

Castles in Highland (council area)
Ruined castles in Highland (council area)
Buildings and structures in Caithness
Scheduled Ancient Monuments in Highland